Oppe Quiñonez (25 March 1933 – 21 November 2019) was a Paraguayan footballer.  He played in eleven matches for the Paraguay national football team from 1963 to 1966. He was also part of Paraguay's squad for the 1963 South American Championship.

References

1933 births
2019 deaths
Paraguayan footballers
Paraguay international footballers
Place of birth missing
Association football forwards